Atabak (also Romanized as Atābak and Atābek) is a village in Kezab Rural District, Khezrabad District, Saduq County, Yazd Province, Iran. At the 2006 census, its population was 215, in 57 families.

References 

Populated places in Saduq County